Born a Muslim: Some Truths about Islam in India is a non-fiction book by Indian journalist Ghazala Wahab. The book presents a case of Muslims in India to those who wonder about them. It talks about the structural discrimination faced by the Muslims and prejudices that persist in India.

The book received the Tata Literature Live Book of the Year award in 2021.

References

2021 non-fiction books
Indian non-fiction books
21st-century Indian literature
Aleph Book Company books